Conotrachelus buchanani is a species in the family Curculionidae ("snout and bark beetles"), in the order Coleoptera ("beetles").
Conotrachelus buchanani is found in North America.

References

Further reading
 American Beetles, Volume II: Polyphaga: Scarabaeoidea through Curculionoidea, Arnett, R.H. Jr., M. C. Thomas, P. E. Skelley and J. H. Frank. (eds.). 2002. CRC Press LLC, Boca Raton, FL.
 American Insects: A Handbook of the Insects of America North of Mexico, Ross H. Arnett. 2000. CRC Press.
 Peterson Field Guides: Beetles, Richard E. White. 1983. Houghton Mifflin Company.
 Poole, Robert W., and Patricia Gentili, eds. (1996). Coleoptera. Nomina Insecta Nearctica: A Check List of the Insects of North America, vol. 1: Coleoptera, Strepsiptera, 41-820.

Curculionidae
Beetles described in 1942